Bartlick is an unincorporated community in Dickenson County, Virginia, in the United States.

History
Bartlick was so named by compounding the name of resident Bartley Belcher with the salt licks found in the area.

References

Unincorporated communities in Dickenson County, Virginia
Unincorporated communities in Virginia